A waitress is a female server of food or drink.

Waitress may also refer to:
 Waitress (film), a 2007 comedy-drama
 Waitress (musical), a 2015 stage musical based on the above
 Waitress!, a 1981 comedy movie
 The Waitress, a 2002 album by Jonathan Byrd
 The Waitresses, a new wave band
 The Waitresses (artists), a performance art collective
 "Waitress", a song by Live from the album Throwing Copper
 The Waitress (It's Always Sunny in Philadelphia), a fictional character